The 1963 Philadelphia Phillies season was the 81st in franchise history. The 87–75 Phillies finished the season in fourth place in the National League, 12 games behind the National League and World Series Champion Los Angeles Dodgers.

Offseason 
 November 21, 1962: Jimmie Coker purchased from the Phillies by the Baltimore Orioles.
 November 26, 1962: Bob Lipski was drafted from the Phillies by the Cleveland Indians in the 1962 rule 5 draft.
 December 11, 1962: Jacke Davis was traded by the Phillies to the Los Angeles Angels for Earl Averill, Jr.

Regular season 
 May 17, 1963, Don Nottebart pitched the first no-hitter for an expansion team when the Houston Colt .45s defeated Philadelphia by a score of 4–1.

Season standings

Record vs. opponents

Notable transactions 
 June 12, 1963: Darrell Sutherland was signed as an amateur free agent by the Phillies.
 August 24, 1963: Dwight Siebler was purchased from the Phillies by the Minnesota Twins.

Game log

|- style="background:#bfb"
| 1 || April 9 || Reds || 2–1 || Art Mahaffey (1–0) || Joey Jay (0–1) || None || 28,291 || 1–0
|- style="background:#bfb"
| 2 || April 10 || Reds || 10–7 || Ray Culp (1–0) || Bill Henry (0–1) || Jack Baldschun (1) || 6,065 || 2–0
|- style="background:#fbb"
| 3 || April 13 || @ Cardinals || 0–7 || Curt Simmons (1–0) || Art Mahaffey (1–1) || None || 22,050 || 2–1
|- style="background:#bfb"
| 4 || April 14 (1) || @ Cardinals || 4–3 (10) || Jack Baldschun (1–0) || Bobby Shantz (0–1) || Jack Hamilton (1) || see 2nd game || 3–1
|- style="background:#bfb"
| 5 || April 14 (2) || @ Cardinals || 5–4 || Jack Baldschun (2–0) || Ron Taylor (0–1) || None || 19,257 || 4–1
|- style="background:#fbb"
| 6 || April 16 || @ Braves || 0–8 || Warren Spahn (2–0) || Cal McLish (0–1) || None || 4,098 || 4–2
|- style="background:#fbb"
| 7 || April 17 || @ Braves || 5–6 || Lew Burdette (2–0) || Paul Brown (0–1) || Claude Raymond (1) || 10,569 || 4–3
|- style="background:#fbb"
| 8 || April 18 || @ Braves || 5–6 || Claude Raymond (2–0) || Ray Culp (1–1) || None || 4,256 || 4–4
|- style="background:#fbb"
| 9 || April 19 || Cardinals || 1–5 || Curt Simmons (2–0) || Chris Short (0–1) || None || 14,712 || 4–5
|- style="background:#bfb"
| 10 || April 20 || Cardinals || 6–2 || Marcelino López (1–0) || Ray Sadecki (0–1) || Jack Baldschun (2) || 5,353 || 5–5
|- style="background:#bfb"
| 11 || April 21 (1) || Cardinals || 4–3 (10) || Dallas Green (1–0) || Ed Bauta (0–1) || None || see 2nd game || 6–5
|- style="background:#fbb"
| 12 || April 21 (2) || Cardinals || 5–10 || Harry Fanok (2–0) || Art Mahaffey (1–2) || None || 23,187 || 6–6
|- style="background:#bfb"
| 13 || April 22 || Mets || 8–6 || Ray Culp (2–1) || Tracy Stallard (0–2) || Jack Baldschun (3) || 3,716 || 7–6
|- style="background:#fbb"
| 14 || April 24 || Pirates || 4–6 || Bob Friend (3–0) || Chris Short (0–2) || Roy Face (3) || 4,485 || 7–7
|- style="background:#bfb"
| 15 || April 26 || @ Cubs || 5–2 || Art Mahaffey (2–2) || Glen Hobbie (1–2) || None || 4,093 || 8–7
|- style="background:#fbb"
| 16 || April 27 || @ Cubs || 2–4 || Larry Jackson (3–2) || Ray Culp (2–2) || None || 10,204 || 8–8
|- style="background:#fbb"
| 17 || April 28 || @ Cubs || 1–4 || Bob Buhl (2–2) || Chris Short (0–3) || Don Elston (2) || 11,135 || 8–9
|- style="background:#fbb"
| 18 || April 29 || Giants || 3–4 || Jack Fisher (1–2) || Cal McLish (0–2) || None || 8,233 || 8–10
|- style="background:#bbb"
| – || April 30 || Giants || colspan=6 | Postponed (rain); Makeup: July 10
|-

|- style="background:#bbb"
| – || May 1 || Dodgers || colspan=6 | Postponed (rain); Makeup: September 13 as a traditional double-header
|- style="background:#fbb"
| 19 || May 2 || Dodgers || 2–3 || Ron Perranoski (3–1) || Art Mahaffey (2–3) || None || 11,288 || 8–11
|- style="background:#bfb"
| 20 || May 3 || Colt .45s || 4–3 || Jack Hamilton (1–0) || Bob Bruce (1–2) || Jack Baldschun (4) || 5,843 || 9–11
|- style="background:#bfb"
| 21 || May 4 || Colt .45s || 7–0 || Ray Culp (3–2) || Ken Johnson (1–4) || None || 3,361 || 10–11
|- style="background:#bfb"
| 22 || May 5 (1) || Colt .45s || 6–5 || Jack Hamilton (2–0) || Hal Woodeshick (1–1) || None || see 2nd game || 11–11
|- style="background:#fbb"
| 23 || May 5 (2) || Colt .45s || 2–6 || Turk Farrell (2–3) || Johnny Klippstein (0–1) || None || 11,185 || 11–12
|- style="background:#fbb"
| 24 || May 7 || @ Mets || 1–3 || Al Jackson (3–2) || Art Mahaffey (2–4) || None || 8,962 || 11–13
|- style="background:#fbb"
| 25 || May 8 || @ Mets || 2–3 || Jay Hook (1–4) || Jack Baldschun (2–1) || None || 4,237 || 11–14
|- style="background:#fbb"
| 26 || May 9 || @ Mets || 2–3 || Ken MacKenzie (3–0) || Jack Baldschun (2–2) || None || 3,435 || 11–15
|- style="background:#fbb"
| 27 || May 10 || Braves || 1–4 (7) || Denny Lemaster (1–1) || Chris Short (0–4) || None || 11,904 || 11–16
|- style="background:#bfb"
| 28 || May 11 || Braves || 8–5 || Ryne Duren (1–0) || Hank Fischer (0–2) || None || 3,192 || 12–16
|- style="background:#bfb"
| 29 || May 12 (1) || Braves || 4–3 (11) || Jack Baldschun (3–2) || Tony Cloninger (0–2) || None || see 2nd game || 13–16
|- style="background:#bfb"
| 30 || May 12 (2) || Braves || 6–5 (12) || Johnny Klippstein (1–1) || Lew Burdette (3–4) || None || 9,836 || 14–16
|- style="background:#bfb"
| 31 || May 14 || @ Dodgers || 5–1 || Cal McLish (1–2) || Don Drysdale (3–4) || None || 19,294 || 15–16
|- style="background:#fbb"
| 32 || May 15 || @ Dodgers || 2–3 (12) || Sandy Koufax (5–1) || Johnny Klippstein (1–2) || None || 20,512 || 15–17
|- style="background:#bfb"
| 33 || May 16 || @ Colt .45s || 5–2 || Ray Culp (4–2) || Dick Drott (1–1) || Jack Baldschun (5) || 7,027 || 16–17
|- style="background:#fbb"
| 34 || May 17 || @ Colt .45s || 1–4 || Don Nottebart (5–1) || Jack Hamilton (2–1) || None || 8,223 || 16–18
|- style="background:#fbb"
| 35 || May 18 || @ Colt .45s || 2–3 || Ken Johnson (2–6) || Jack Baldschun (3–3) || None || 5,409 || 16–19
|- style="background:#bfb"
| 36 || May 19 (1) || @ Giants || 3–0 || Cal McLish (2–2) || Jack Fisher (3–4) || None || see 2nd game || 17–19
|- style="background:#fbb"
| 37 || May 19 (2) || @ Giants || 5–6 || Bobby Bolin (2–0) || Ryne Duren (1–1) || None || 37,632 || 17–20
|- style="background:#fbb"
| 38 || May 21 || @ Giants || 2–3 || Billy O'Dell (6–0) || Ray Culp (4–3) || None || 7,556 || 17–21
|- style="background:#fbb"
| 39 || May 22 || @ Giants || 2–10 || Jack Sanford (7–3) || Dallas Green (1–1) || None || 6,501 || 17–22
|- style="background:#bfb"
| 40 || May 24 || @ Reds || 5–1 || Cal McLish (3–2) || Bob Purkey (1–1) || None || 9,367 || 18–22
|- style="background:#fbb"
| 41 || May 25 || @ Reds || 2–5 || Joe Nuxhall (4–2) || Art Mahaffey (2–5) || None || 5,419 || 18–23
|- style="background:#bfb"
| 42 || May 26 (1) || @ Reds || 10–4 || Chris Short (1–4) || Jim Maloney (6–2) || Jack Baldschun (6) || see 2nd game || 19–23
|- style="background:#bfb"
| 43 || May 26 (2) || @ Reds || 3–0 || Ray Culp (5–3) || Joey Jay (1–8) || None || 14,417 || 20–23
|- style="background:#bfb"
| 44 || May 28 || @ Pirates || 5–1 || Cal McLish (4–2) || Bob Friend (5–4) || None || 8,497 || 21–23
|- style="background:#fbb"
| 45 || May 30 (1) || @ Pirates || 1–7 || Don Cardwell (2–6) || Art Mahaffey (2–6) || None || see 2nd game || 21–24
|- style="background:#bfb"
| 46 || May 30 (2) || @ Pirates || 6–5 || Ray Culp (6–3) || Joe Gibbon (2–3) || Johnny Klippstein (1) || 19,039 || 22–24
|- style="background:#fbb"
| 47 || May 31 || Cubs || 1–2 || Bob Buhl (4–4) || Chris Short' (1–5) || Lindy McDaniel (9) || 10,717 || 22–25
|-

|- style="background:#fbb"
| 48 || June 1 || Cubs || 0–2 || Dick Ellsworth (7–3) || John Boozer (0–1) || None || 3,902 || 22–26
|- style="background:#bfb"
| 49 || June 2 (1) || Cubs || 5–2 || Cal McLish (5–2) || Jim Brewer (2–1) || None || see 2nd game || 23–26
|- style="background:#fbb"
| 50 || June 2 (2) || Cubs || 2–3 || Barney Schultz (1–0) || Art Mahaffey (2–7) || Lindy McDaniel (10) || 8,009 || 23–27
|- style="background:#bfb"
| 51 || June 5 || Cardinals || 6–0 || Ray Culp (7–3) || Curt Simmons (6–2) || None || 35,621 || 24–27
|- style="background:#fbb"
| 52 || June 6 || Cardinals || 4–5 || Bob Gibson (4–3) || Chris Short (1–6) || Ray Sadecki (1) || 8,280 || 24–28
|- style="background:#bbb"
| – || June 7 || Reds || colspan=6 | Postponed (rain); Makeup: August 6 as a traditional double-header
|- style="background:#fbb"
| 53 || June 8 || Reds || 0–1 || Jim O'Toole (10–3) || Art Mahaffey (2–8) || None || 4,519 || 24–29
|- style="background:#bfb"
| 54 || June 9 (1) || Reds || 8–7 (10) || Johnny Klippstein (2–2) || Dom Zanni (0–1) || None || see 2nd game || 25–29
|- style="background:#fbb"
| 55 || June 9 (2) || Reds || 1–3 || John Tsitouris (1–1) || John Boozer (0–2) || None || 14,289 || 25–30
|- style="background:#bfb"
| 56 || June 10 || Braves || 6–2 (6) || Ray Culp (8–3) || Bob Hendley (4–4) || None || 9,404 || 26–30
|- style="background:#bfb"
| 57 || June 11 || Braves || 8–7 (10) || Jack Baldschun (4–3) || Bob Shaw (2–4) || None || 11,107 || 27–30
|- style="background:#bfb"
| 58 || June 12 || @ Cardinals || 6–2 || Art Mahaffey (3–8) || Ron Taylor (3–2) || John Boozer (1) || 11,738 || 28–30
|- style="background:#fbb"
| 59 || June 13 || @ Cardinals || 3–7 (6) || Ernie Broglio (7–2) || Chris Short (1–7) || None || 7,600 || 28–31
|- style="background:#fbb"
| 60 || June 14 || @ Braves || 0–3 || Warren Spahn (9–3) || Ray Culp (8–4) || None || 10,937 || 28–32
|- style="background:#fbb"
| 61 || June 15 || @ Braves || 3–5 || Tony Cloninger (1–3) || Johnny Klippstein (2–3) || None || 6,855 || 28–33
|- style="background:#fbb"
| 62 || June 16 (1) || @ Braves || 3–5 || Frank Funk (2–2) || Cal McLish (5–3) || Claude Raymond (4) || see 2nd game || 28–34
|- style="background:#bfb"
| 63 || June 16 (2) || @ Braves || 7–4 (11) || Jack Baldschun (5–3) || Claude Raymond (4–4) || Dallas Green (1) || 16,326 || 29–34
|- style="background:#bfb"
| 64 || June 17 || @ Reds || 4–2 || Ryne Duren (2–1) || John Tsitouris (2–2) || Jack Baldschun (7) || 6,093 || 30–34
|- style="background:#fbb"
| 65 || June 18 || @ Reds || 1–2 || Al Worthington (2–1) || Ray Culp (8–5) || None || 6,646 || 30–35
|- style="background:#fbb"
| 66 || June 19 || @ Reds || 5–6 (10) || Dom Zanni (1–1) || Chris Short (1–8) || None || 7,237 || 30–36
|- style="background:#fbb"
| 67 || June 20 || @ Reds || 1–11 || Jim O'Toole (13–3) || Art Mahaffey (3–9) || Jim Owens (2) || 7,077 || 30–37
|- style="background:#fbb"
| 68 || June 21 || @ Mets || 1–3 || Al Jackson (6–7) || Cal McLish (5–4) || None || 11,047 || 30–38
|- style="background:#bfb"
| 69 || June 22 || @ Mets || 2–0 || Ray Culp (9–5) || Roger Craig (2–11) || None || 16,791 || 31–38
|- style="background:#fbb"
| 70 || June 23 (1) || @ Mets || 0–5 || Carl Willey (6–6) || Dallas Green (1–2) || None || see 2nd game || 31–39
|- style="background:#fbb"
| 71 || June 23 (2) || @ Mets || 1–4 || Tracy Stallard (3–4) || Ryne Duren (2–2) || Al Jackson (1) || 19,901 || 31–40
|- style="background:#bfb"
| 72 || June 25 || @ Pirates || 5–4 (10) || Johnny Klippstein (3–3) || Harvey Haddix (2–3) || Dennis Bennett (1) || 12,365 || 32–40
|- style="background:#bfb"
| 73 || June 26 || @ Pirates || 6–2 || Cal McLish (6–4) || Bob Friend (9–6) || None || 9,153 || 33–40
|- style="background:#bfb"
| 74 || June 27 || @ Pirates || 13–4 || Ray Culp (10–5) || Don Cardwell (3–9) || Johnny Klippstein (2) || 9,576 || 34–40
|- style="background:#fbb"
| 75 || June 28 || Cubs || 3–4 (11) || Dick Ellsworth (10–6) || Jack Baldschun (5–4) || None || 9,653 || 34–41
|- style="background:#bbb"
| – || June 29 || Cubs || colspan=6 | Postponed (rain); Makeup: August 14 as a traditional double-header
|- style="background:#bfb"
| 76 || June 30 || Cubs || 3–2 || Art Mahaffey (4–9) || Larry Jackson (9–7) || Johnny Klippstein (3) || 6,006 || 35–41
|-

|- style="background:#fbb"
| 77 || July 1 (1) || Pirates || 1–2 || Don Cardwell (4–9) || Ray Culp (10–6) || None || see 2nd game || 35–42
|- style="background:#bfb"
| 78 || July 1 (2) || Pirates || 8–1 || Cal McLish (7–4) || Earl Francis (3–3) || None || 21,661 || 36–42
|- style="background:#fbb"
| 79 || July 2 || Pirates || 2–3 || Vern Law (2–3) || Dallas Green (1–3) || Al McBean (4) || 6,844 || 36–43
|- style="background:#bfb"
| 80 || July 4 (1) || Pirates || 1–0 (10) || Art Mahaffey (5–9) || Bob Friend (10–7) || None || see 2nd game || 37–43
|- style="background:#bfb"
| 81 || July 4 (2) || Pirates || 5–1 || Ryne Duren (3–2) || Joe Gibbon (3–6) || None || 16,198 || 38–43
|- style="background:#fbb"
| 82 || July 5 || @ Cubs || 2–3 (11) || Lindy McDaniel (5–2) || Johnny Klippstein (3–4) || None || 17,395 || 38–44
|- style="background:#bfb"
| 83 || July 6 || @ Cubs || 6–0 || Cal McLish (8–4) || Bob Buhl (7–6) || None || 16,348 || 39–44
|- style="background:#bfb"
| 84 || July 7 || @ Cubs || 3–2 || Jack Baldschun (6–4) || Lindy McDaniel (5–3) || Dallas Green (2) || 18,277 || 40–44
|- style="background:#bbcaff;"
| – || July 9 ||colspan="7" |1963 Major League Baseball All-Star Game at Cleveland Stadium in Cleveland
|- style="background:#bfb"
| 85 || July 10 || Giants || 10–2 || Cal McLish (9–4) || Billy O'Dell (10–5) || Johnny Klippstein (4) || 12,240 || 41–44
|- style="background:#fbb"
| 86 || July 11 || Giants || 3–4 || Juan Marichal (14–4) || Ray Culp (10–7) || Bobby Bolin (7) || 26,303 || 41–45
|- style="background:#bfb"
| 87 || July 12 || Giants || 7–5 || Art Mahaffey (6–9) || Jack Sanford (9–9) || Jack Baldschun (8) || 22,496 || 42–45
|- style="background:#bfb"
| 88 || July 13 || Giants || 4–3 || Ryne Duren (4–2) || Billy Pierce (3–6) || Jack Baldschun (9) || 10,453 || 43–45
|- style="background:#fbb"
| 89 || July 14 || Dodgers || 2–3 (6) || Johnny Podres (8–6) || Cal McLish (9–5) || None || 23,542 || 43–46
|- style="background:#bfb"
| 90 || July 15 || Dodgers || 5–4 (11) || Jack Baldschun (7–4) || Ed Roebuck (2–4) || None || 19,488 || 44–46
|- style="background:#fbb"
| 91 || July 16 (1) || Dodgers || 2–5 || Sandy Koufax (16–3) || Art Mahaffey (6–10) || None || see 2nd game || 44–47
|- style="background:#bfb"
| 92 || July 16 (2) || Dodgers || 10–2 || Dallas Green (2–3) || Nick Willhite (2–3) || None || 35,353 || 45–47
|- style="background:#bfb"
| 93 || July 17 || Colt .45s || 10–9 (10) || Dennis Bennett (1–0) || Jim Dickson (0–1) || None || 5,796 || 46–47
|- style="background:#bfb"
| 94 || July 18 || Colt .45s || 5–1 || John Boozer (1–2) || Ken Johnson (5–13) || None || 5,646 || 47–47
|- style="background:#bfb"
| 95 || July 19 || Mets || 2–1 || Jack Baldschun (8–4) || Roger Craig (2–16) || None || 10,754 || 48–47
|- style="background:#bfb"
| 96 || July 20 || Mets || 5–1 || Dallas Green (3–3) || Al Jackson (6–11) || None || 3,440 || 49–47
|- style="background:#bfb"
| 97 || July 21 (1) || Mets || 8–0 || Chris Short (2–8) || Carl Willey (7–9) || None || see 2nd game || 50–47
|- style="background:#bfb"
| 98 || July 21 (2) || Mets || 7–2 || Dennis Bennett (2–0) || Tracy Stallard (3–8) || Johnny Klippstein (5) || 14,372 || 51–47
|- style="background:#fbb"
| 99 || July 23 || @ Colt .45s || 5–6 (15) || Turk Farrell (7–8) || Johnny Klippstein (3–5) || None || 8,553 || 51–48
|- style="background:#bfb"
| 100 || July 24 || @ Colt .45s || 6–3 || Cal McLish (10–5) || Ken Johnson (5–14) || Jack Baldschun (10) || 6,879 || 52–48
|- style="background:#fbb"
| 101 || July 25 || @ Colt .45s || 0–3 || Hal Brown (4–5) || Ray Culp (10–8) || None || 5,357 || 52–49
|- style="background:#bfb"
| 102 || July 26 || @ Dodgers || 6–5 || Chris Short (3–8) || Bob Miller (7–6) || Jack Baldschun (11) || 30,589 || 53–49
|- style="background:#bfb"
| 103 || July 27 || @ Dodgers || 4–1 || Dennis Bennett (3–0) || Johnny Podres (10–7) || Johnny Klippstein (6) || 36,262 || 54–49
|- style="background:#bfb"
| 104 || July 28 || @ Dodgers || 7–4 || John Boozer (2–2) || Don Drysdale (13–11) || None || 32,996 || 55–49
|- style="background:#fbb"
| 105 || July 29 || @ Dodgers || 2–6 || Sandy Koufax (17–4) || Cal McLish (10–6) || None || 32,835 || 55–50
|- style="background:#fbb"
| 106 || July 30 || @ Giants || 0–5 || Billy O'Dell (11–6) || Ray Culp (10–9) || None || 20,686 || 55–51
|- style="background:#bfb"
| 107 || July 31 || @ Giants || 7–3 (14) || Jack Baldschun (9–4) || Bobby Bolin (6–4) || Johnny Klippstein (7) || 17,927 || 56–51
|-

|- style="background:#fbb"
| 108 || August 2 || @ Cardinals || 2–3 || Ray Sadecki (7–7) || Dennis Bennett (3–1) || Bobby Shantz (9) || 20,025 || 56–52
|- style="background:#fbb"
| 109 || August 3 || @ Cardinals || 0–7 || Ernie Broglio (12–7) || Cal McLish (10–7) || None || 11,417 || 56–53
|- style="background:#bfb"
| 110 || August 4 (1) || @ Cardinals || 7–3 || Ray Culp (11–9) || Lew Burdette (8–9) || Jack Baldschun (12) || see 2nd game || 57–53
|- style="background:#bfb"
| 111 || August 4 (2) || @ Cardinals || 5–2 || Dallas Green (4–3) || Bob Gibson (12–6) || Jack Baldschun (13) || 26,039 || 58–53
|- style="background:#fbb"
| 112 || August 6 (1) || Reds || 4–6 (10) || Bill Henry (1–2) || Jack Baldschun (9–5) || None || see 2nd game || 58–54
|- style="background:#bfb"
| 113 || August 6 (2) || Reds || 7–1 || Dennis Bennett (4–1) || Joey Jay (4–16) || None || 32,761 || 59–54
|- style="background:#bfb"
| 114 || August 7 || Reds || 2–1 || Cal McLish (11–7) || Jim Maloney (17–4) || None || 9,964 || 60–54
|- style="background:#fbb"
| 115 || August 8 || Reds || 3–6 || John Tsitouris (8–5) || Chris Short (3–9) || Bill Henry (9) || 15,058 || 60–55
|- style="background:#fbb"
| 116 || August 9 || Giants || 0–4 || Juan Marichal (18–5) || Ray Culp (11–10) || None || 27,145 || 60–56
|- style="background:#fbb"
| 117 || August 10 || Giants || 6–7 || Bobby Bolin (7–4) || Dennis Bennett (4–2) || Billy Hoeft (2) || 11,012 || 60–57
|- style="background:#fbb"
| 118 || August 11 || Giants || 1–5 || Jack Sanford (11–12) || Cal McLish (11–8) || Don Larsen (4) || 15,874 || 60–58
|- style="background:#bfb"
| 119 || August 12 || Giants || 3–1 || Chris Short (4–9) || Jim Duffalo (4–1) || None || 20,671 || 61–58
|- style="background:#bfb"
| 120 || August 14 (1) || Cubs || 7–2 || Johnny Klippstein (4–5) || Larry Jackson (13–11) || None || see 2nd game || 62–58
|- style="background:#bfb"
| 121 || August 14 (2) || Cubs || 9–3 || Dennis Bennett (5–2) || Paul Toth (3–8) || None || 22,553 || 63–58
|- style="background:#bfb"
| 122 || August 15 || Cubs || 4–3 || Cal McLish (12–8) || Bob Buhl (9–11) || Jack Baldschun (14) || 13,403 || 64–58
|- style="background:#bfb"
| 123 || August 16 || @ Pirates || 3–0 || Chris Short (5–9) || Joe Gibbon (5–8) || None || 12,031 || 65–58
|- style="background:#bfb"
| 124 || August 17 || @ Pirates || 5–3 || Ryne Duren (5–2) || Bob Friend (14–11) || None || 7,881 || 66–58
|- style="background:#bfb"
| 125 || August 18 || @ Pirates || 3–1 || Johnny Klippstein (5–5) || Don Schwall (6–8) || None || 10,696 || 67–58
|- style="background:#bfb"
| 126 || August 19 || Mets || 1–0 || Dennis Bennett (6–2) || Galen Cisco (7–13) || None || 7,980 || 68–58
|- style="background:#fbb"
| 127 || August 20 (1) || Mets || 0–4 || Grover Powell (1–0) || Cal McLish (12–9) || None || see 2nd game || 68–59
|- style="background:#bfb"
| 128 || August 20 (2) || Mets || 2–1 (12) || Ryne Duren (6–2) || Larry Bearnarth (2–5) || None || 24,923 || 69–59
|- style="background:#bbb"
| – || August 21 || Mets || colspan=6 | Postponed (rain); Makeup: September 9
|- style="background:#bfb"
| 129 || August 23 || Pirates || 4–2 || Dennis Bennett (7–2) || Don Schwall (6–9) || Jack Baldschun (15) || 18,126 || 70–59
|- style="background:#fbb"
| 130 || August 24 || Pirates || 0–7 || Don Cardwell (12–12) || Chris Short (5–10) || None || 18,276 || 70–60
|- style="background:#bfb"
| 131 || August 25 || Pirates || 4–2 (11) || Jack Baldschun (10–5) || Roy Face (3–7) || None || 10,183 || 71–60
|- style="background:#fbb"
| 132 || August 27 || @ Cubs || 3–4 || Lindy McDaniel (9–6) || Jack Baldschun (10–6) || None || 11,785 || 71–61
|- style="background:#bfb"
| 133 || August 28 || @ Cubs || 8–7 || Dallas Green (5–3) || Paul Toth (5–9) || Ryne Duren (1) || 6,113 || 72–61
|- style="background:#fbb"
| 134 || August 29 || @ Cubs || 1–2 || Dick Ellsworth (19–7) || John Boozer (2–3) || None || 10,954 || 72–62
|- style="background:#fbb"
| 135 || August 30 || Cardinals || 6–11 || Ray Sadecki (8–8) || Ray Culp (11–11) || Ron Taylor (8) || 26,988 || 72–63
|- style="background:#fbb"
| 136 || August 31 || Cardinals || 5–7 (11) || Bobby Shantz (5–3) || Johnny Klippstein (5–6) || None || 11,382 || 72–64
|-

|- style="background:#fbb"
| 137 || September 1 || Cardinals || 3–7 || Curt Simmons (12–7) || Chris Short (5–11) || None || 17,575 || 72–65
|- style="background:#bfb"
| 138 || September 2 || @ Braves || 9–4 || Cal McLish (13–9) || Tony Cloninger (9–9) || None || 13,654 || 73–65
|- style="background:#bfb"
| 139 || September 3 || @ Braves || 2–0 || Ray Culp (12–11) || Denny Lemaster (11–9) || None || 4,949 || 74–65
|- style="background:#bfb"
| 140 || September 4 || @ Reds || 3–2 || Dennis Bennett (8–2) || Jim O'Toole (17–12) || None || 4,906 || 75–65
|- style="background:#fbb"
| 141 || September 6 || Braves || 0–5 || Bob Shaw (6–10) || Cal McLish (13–10) || None || 10,767 || 75–66
|- style="background:#fbb"
| 142 || September 7 || Braves || 4–6 (10) || Bobby Tiefenauer (1–1) || Jack Baldschun (10–7) || None || 11,589 || 75–67
|- style="background:#fbb"
| 143 || September 8 || Braves || 2–3 || Warren Spahn (20–5) || Dallas Green (5–4) || None || 8,807 || 75–68
|- style="background:#fbb"
| 144 || September 9 || Mets || 3–6 || Roger Craig (5–20) || Dennis Bennett (8–3) || None || 3,232 || 75–69
|- style="background:#bfb"
| 145 || September 10 || Colt .45s || 16–0 || Chris Short (6–11) || Don Nottebart (9–7) || None || 3,645 || 76–69
|- style="background:#fbb"
| 146 || September 11 || Colt .45s || 2–4 || Turk Farrell (12–13) || Cal McLish (13–11) || None || 3,412 || 76–70
|- style="background:#bfb"
| 147 || September 12 || Colt .45s || 4–1 || Ray Culp (13–11) || Hal Brown (5–11) || None || 2,849 || 77–70
|- style="background:#bfb"
| 148 || September 13 (1) || Dodgers || 3–2 || Chris Short (7–11) || Larry Sherry (2–6) || None || see 2nd game || 78–70
|- style="background:#fbb"
| 149 || September 13 (2) || Dodgers || 1–2 || Ron Perranoski (15–3) || Dennis Bennett (8–4) || None || 26,024 || 78–71
|- style="background:#fbb"
| 150 || September 14 || Dodgers || 1–5 || Pete Richert (5–1) || John Boozer (2–4) || None || 10,410 || 78–72
|- style="background:#bfb"
| 151 || September 15 || Dodgers || 6–1 || Dallas Green (6–4) || Don Drysdale (17–17) || None || 16,796 || 79–72
|- style="background:#bfb"
| 152 || September 17 || @ Mets || 8–6 || Ray Culp (14–11) || Tracy Stallard (6–16) || Johnny Klippstein (8) || 2,047 || 80–72
|- style="background:#bfb"
| 153 || September 18 || @ Mets || 5–1 || Chris Short (8–11) || Craig Anderson (0–1) || None || 1,752 || 81–72
|- style="background:#fbb"
| 154 || September 20 || @ Colt .45s || 2–3 || Ken Johnson (10–17) || Dennis Bennett (8–5) || None || 4,039 || 81–73
|- style="background:#bfb"
| 155 || September 21 || @ Colt .45s || 4–3 || Dallas Green (7–4) || Hal Woodeshick (11–9) || None || 2,231 || 82–73
|- style="background:#fbb"
| 156 || September 22 || @ Colt .45s || 1–2 || Turk Farrell (14–13) || Chris Short (8–12) || None || 3,493 || 82–74
|- style="background:#bfb"
| 157 || September 24 || @ Giants || 5–4 || Jack Baldschun (11–7) || Don Larsen (7–7) || None || 8,360 || 83–74
|- style="background:#bfb"
| 158 || September 25 || @ Giants || 6–4 || Art Mahaffey (7–10) || Billy Pierce (3–11) || Jack Baldschun (16) || 4,360 || 84–74
|- style="background:#fbb"
| 159 || September 26 || @ Giants || 0–10 || Billy O'Dell (14–10) || Dallas Green (7–5) || None || 3,691 || 84–75
|- style="background:#bfb"
| 160 || September 27 || @ Dodgers || 5–3 || John Boozer (3–4) || Pete Richert (5–2) || Ryne Duren (2) || 34,689 || 85–75
|- style="background:#bfb"
| 161 || September 28 || @ Dodgers || 12–3 || Dennis Bennett (9–5) || Johnny Podres (14–12) || None || 37,212 || 86–75
|- style="background:#bfb"
| 162 || September 29 || @ Dodgers || 3–1 || Chris Short (9–12) || Pete Richert (5–3) || None || 19,237 || 87–75
|-

| style="text-align:left;" |
The June 2, 1963 (game 2), game was protested by the Phillies in the bottom of the third inning. The protest was later denied.

 Roster 

 Player stats 

 Batting 

 Starters by position 
Note: Pos = Position; G = Games played; AB = At bats; H = Hits; Avg. = Batting average; HR = Home runs; RBI = Runs batted in

 Other batters 
Note: G = Games played; AB = At bats; H = Hits; Avg. = Batting average; HR = Home runs; RBI = Runs batted in

 Pitching 

 Starting pitchers 
Note: G = Games pitched; IP = Innings pitched; W = Wins; L = Losses; ERA = Earned run average; SO = Strikeouts

 Other pitchers 
Note: G = Games pitched; IP = Innings pitched; W = Wins; L = Losses; ERA = Earned run average; SO = Strikeouts

 Relief pitchers 
Note: G = Games pitched; W = Wins; L = Losses; SV = Saves; ERA = Earned run average; SO = Strikeouts

 Awards and honors All-Star Game'Ray Culp, reserve

 Farm system 

 Notes 

 References 
1963 Philadelphia Phillies season at Baseball Reference''

Philadelphia Phillies seasons
Philadelphia Phillies season
Philadelph